Caterham Racing is the practice of racing Caterham Seven-type sportscars.

History
The Caterham Seven (or Caterham 7) is a small sports car produced by Caterham Cars in the United Kingdom. It is based on the Lotus Seven, a lightweight sports car sold in kit and pre-built form by Lotus Cars, from the late 1950s to the early 1970s. After Lotus ended production of the Lotus Seven, in 1972, Caterham bought the rights to the design, and today make both kits and fully assembled cars. 2007 marked the 50th year of production of the Lotus/Caterham 7.

The Lotus 7 was conceived by Colin Chapman as a car to be raced. Whilst still a prototype, in September 1957, it was raced at the Brighton Speed Trials and by the end of 1958 Graham Hill was winning races with the Coventry Climax-engined 'Super Seven' The car has had a strong racing history throughout its life under both Lotus and Caterham stewardship. Amongst the marques more famous races was victory in the Nelson Ledges 24-hour race in Ohio when, against a field including works teams from Honda and Mazda, a four-man team from Caterham (including both Jez Coates and Robert Nearn) won by seven laps (after 990 laps) in a modified Vauxhall HPC.

After dominating open class races for decades a one-make championship for Caterhams was begun in 1986 and won by Kelvin Foy. Caterham 7 races have since expanded to include club and competitive races in the United Kingdom, continental Europe, Canada, the United States and Asia.

The car was banned from racing in the USA in the 1960s, as being "Too fast to race" and again in the UK in the 1970s for the same reasons, which prompted Caterham Cars boss Graham Nearn to produce 'T' shirts with "Caterham Seven, the car that's "Too Fast to Race. ..". Both bans were later lifted. In 2002 an R400 won its class (and came 11th overall out of 200 starters) at the 24 Hours Nürburgring race by 10 laps, ahead of competition that included Porsche and BMW racecars, leading, once again, to a ban on entry in subsequent years.

Current Caterham Racing
There are many Caterham Racing Championships across the world, the majority administered in some way by Caterham Cars. It is estimated that there are over 700 competitors in 20 Caterham championships across 11 countries, and many more that compete in sprint and hillclimb events.

The Caterham Motorsport Ladder
The Caterham Motorsport Ladder is a progression through the various Caterham Cars championships, starting with the Caterham Academy, and moving through ultimately to their most prestigious European events. The championships which form the ladder are:

Caterham Academy Championship
In 1995 the Caterham Academy, a novices-only format, was introduced in the UK as the Caterham Scholarship. For £26,495 (2019 price), entrants get a modified Roadsport kit (a factory-built option is available for extra cost) with a sealed Ford Sigma engine and 5-speed gearbox. Having completed the ARDS (racing) licence qualification, the season then consists of a setup day, one speed events (sprints and hillclimbs), and six circuit races.

Since 2000, the popularity of the Academy has led to Caterham providing two parallel Academy championships (Group Green & Group White), each resulting in an Academy champion at the end of the year.  Approximately 1,000 racing drivers have been created through the Caterham Academy.

Over the course of the 2019 Academy season the white group drivers recorded substantially quicker times than their green group counterparts.

Caterham Roadsport Championship
The Caterham Roadsport Championship is largely for drivers that have come through the previous season's Academy. Some minor modifications are permitted to the car, including fitting a rear anti-roll bar and sticky Avon ZZS tyres. Technical support is still provided by the factory, and professional team support is not permitted. The season features 20-minute races at 7 'double-header' meetings. One of the rounds takes place at a European circuit with recent visits to Zolder, Zandvoort, Spa-Francorchamps and Nürburgring. Since 2009, the Caterham Roadsport Championship will be available exclusively to Sigma-engined cars.

Caterham Seven 270R Championship
Caterham 270R cars are still ex-Academy cars. However they feature the upgrades for the Caterham Roadsport Championship car plus a number of performance upgrades such removing the windscreens and lights, widetrack front suspension, uprated dampers and a raised rev limit. Professional team support is also allowed. The Caterham Seven 270R Championship races at the same events as Caterham Roadsport, but has longer 30-minute races.

Caterham Seven 310R Championship
Caterham Seven 310R cars are the 'ultimate' incarnation of the Caterham Academy car. They feature all the upgrades of Roadsport and Seven 270R and also feature a limited slip differential and a power increase. In 2017, the 310R was introduced to replace the outgoing Supersport cars and both cars ran in separate championships before the Supersport series was disbanded before the start of the 2018 season.

Caterham Seven 420R Championship
The Seven 420R (formerly known as Superlight R300) was introduced for 2009 and is now the premier class of the Caterham Motorsport ladder. The car is unique on the ladder in that it is not an evolution of the Caterham Academy car but instead is a unique chassis and uses the 2.0l Ford Duratec engine as opposed to the Ford Sigma engine used in the other series in the ladder. 2014 saw the introduction of an optional 6-speed sequential gearbox.

Caterham Graduates Racing Club

Background
The Caterham Graduates Championship was started in 1998 by competitors from the 1997 Caterham Scholarship. In its first two years, it was a multi-discipline series, with the rounds being made up of sprints, hillclimbs and circuit races, similar to the Caterham Scholarship format. The emphasis moved more and more towards circuit races, and from 2000-on the series has been entirely circuit races.

The Grads Club is independent of the Caterham Motorsport Ladder, and is run by its members. The series is one of the largest in the UK, if not the largest, with well over 100 registered competitors. The competitors come from a variety of backgrounds. A number have "graduated" from the novice Caterham Scholarship and Academy series, whilst many others have made it their first foray into motorsport.

Classes
Current classes are:

Classic Graduate
1600cc Ford or Vauxhall engined Caterham Sevens with a live axle, from the Caterham Scholarship or Academy 1997 - 2000. These cars are fully road legal and produce around 100 bhp.

Super Graduate
1600cc Rover K-series Caterham Sevens with independent DeDion rear suspension from the Caterham Academy 2001 - 2008. These cars are fully road legal and produce around 125 bhp.

Mega Graduate
Uprated 1600cc Rover K-series Caterham Sevens with independent (DeDion) rear suspension from the Caterham Academy 2001 - 2008. These cars are semi-road legal (no lights or windscreen) and with controlled modifications produce around 150 bhp.

Sigma Graduate
Using the 1600cc Ford Sigma engined cars used in the Academy from 2008 onwards with around 120 hp. Screens (and lights, from 2016) are optional and normally removed.  Headlights were required up to and including the 2015 season but are no longer mandatory. The only other significant change from Academy specification (apart from tyres) is the optional rear anti-roll bar.

Sigmax Graduate

Sigmax Graduate cars run with the same specification as the Supersport class in the Caterham Motorsport ladder and are the 'ultimate' incarnation of the current Caterham Academy car. They feature all the upgrades of Roadsport and Tracksport and also feature a limited slip differential and a power increase to 140bhp.

All Caterham Graduate classes run on Yokohama road legal tyres. Classic Graduates race on list 1A A539s whilst Super, Mega, Sigma and Sigmax use the stickier list 1B A048R

The cars in the series are genuinely road-going and indeed a few are driven to (and hopefully) from races. Many are used by drivers mid-week for commuting, shopping, etc. needing no more than the covering up of competition numbers to make them road-legal (although Mega Graduate and Sigmax Graduate specs have moved away from this with the deletion of lights and windscreen). No changes from the standard specification are allowed and all have sealed engine units putting the emphasis firmly on driving ability rather than car modification. Along with low consumable costs, this keeps the costs of running a car very much under control thus making it one of the most cost-effective ways to go racing. The large grid sizes are a testament to this low-cost formula.

Affordability is a key ingredient to Caterham Graduates racing. Strict regulations allow only limited modifications and work on the sealed engine units is limited to specified engine builders.

Other Caterham Championships around the world
There are a large number of championships around the world both exclusively for Caterham Seven cars, and in which Caterhams compete alongside other cars. Caterham Academies have been introduced in the Netherlands, Portugal, France and other countries.

Caterham Challenge France 
The French Caterham series comprises Academy and 420R classes. They race around many iconic French race circuit throughout the calendar year.

Caterham Challenge LATAM 
The Latin American Caterham Challenge series started in 2015 and was active until 2019. Caterham Seven 310R were used for the first 3 years and replaced by the 420R for the 2018 season. It was the top tier racing series within LaMonomarca which also hosted supporting series within. Drivers across Latin America competed and winners from foreign Caterham Championships were invited to participate.

For the 2018 season it merged with Campeonato Nacional De Automovilismo (CNA) and the drivers competed against each other within their own Caterham category as well as the other cars in the overall race.

Intercity Platinum Cup Turkey 
The Turkish Caterham series started in 2018 using the Caterham Seven 420R and takes place at Istanbul Park racing circuit.

References

External links
Caterham Cars official website
Caterham Motorsport Forum for drivers
Caterham Graduates Racing Club website
Caterham Racing Motorsport Website

Racing
Sports car racing